Dasht-e Hey Bu (also Romanized as Dasht-e Hey Bū) is a village in Mishan Rural District, Mahvarmilani District, Mamasani County, Fars Province, Iran. At the 2006 census, its population was 26, in 6 families.

References 

Populated places in Mamasani County